Kentucky Route 88 (KY 88) is a  state highway in west central Kentucky. It traverses Grayson, Hart, and Green counties in Kentucky. It originates in Clarkson and ends near Greensburg

Route description
KY 88 begins in Clarkson, along US 62 in Grayson County. KY 88 traverses the Western Kentucky Parkway via an overpass without access. It passes through the communities of Grayson Springs, Peonia, and Wax. It enters Hart County by crossing over Nolin Lake. KY 88 then traverses Cub Run at the junction with KY 728 before going on to Munfordville. It runs concurrently with US 31W in downtown Munfordville and on the bridge over the Green River. 

KY 88 splits from US 31W near the Hart County High School to continue east to cross US 31E at Hardyville. KY 88 enters Green County after passing through Monroe. It crosses the Green River a second time before ending just north of Greensburg along KY 61.

Major intersections

References

External links

KY 88 at Kentucky Roads

0088
0088
0088
0088